Ust-Vymsky District (Jemdïn rajon) is an administrative district (raion), one of the twelve in the Komi Republic, Russia. It is located in the southwest of the republic. Its administrative center is the rural locality (a selo) of Aykino. As of the 2010 Census, the total population of the district was 29,474, with the population of Aykino accounting for 11.4% of that number.

Administrative and municipal status
Within the framework of administrative divisions, Ust-Vymsky District is one of the twelve in the Komi Republic. It is divided into one town of district significance administrative territory (Mikun), one urban-type settlement administrative territory (Zheshart), five selo administrative territories, and five settlement administrative territories, all of which comprise fifty-one rural localities. As a municipal division, the district is incorporated as Ust-Vymsky Municipal District. Mikun Town of District Significance Administrative Territory and Zheshart Urban-Type Settlement Administrative Territory are incorporated into two urban settlements, and the ten remaining administrative territories are incorporated into ten rural settlements within the municipal district. The selo of Aykino serves as the administrative center of both the administrative and municipal district.

References

Notes

Sources

Districts of the Komi Republic
